"U Want Me 2" is a song by Sarah McLachlan and the lead original single from her 2008 greatest hits album, Closer: The Best of Sarah McLachlan. It is also included on her 2010 album Laws of Illusion. The song was produced by her longtime collaborator, Pierre Marchand. 

"U Want Me 2" was included in the Les Mills International BodyBalance (BodyFlow in the US/Canada) fitness program as Track 5 - Hip Openers for Release 47.

In the music video that was released and directed by Sophie Muller, she performed underwater.

Nettwerk first released an alternate version of "U Want Me 2" for digital download. It starts with a Hi-Hat and has a slightly different Instrumentation. 

 "U Want Me 2" (Alternate Version aka Canadian Version) 3:59
 "U Want Me 2" (Album Version) 4:07
 "U Want Me 2" (Radio Mix) 4:09

Charts

References

External links
Billboard single review
Chart positions

2008 singles
2008 songs
Sarah McLachlan songs
Arista Records singles
Nettwerk Records singles
Songs written by Sarah McLachlan
Songs written by Pierre Marchand